UAM-I is a station along Line 8 of the Mexico City Metro.

The station's logo is the logo of the Universidad Autónoma Metropolitana campus Iztapalapa, which is close to the station. The station was opened on 20 July 1994.  Until September 1996 this station was known as La Purísima, the name of the street where it is located. The previous logo was the silhouette of the Virgin of Guadalupe.

Curiosities 
Although the name of the station has changed, it can be appreciated on the platforms the murals depicting La Purísima. That is, as the station was opened with that name, and until being renamed UAM-I, still keeps design iconography and original name.

Exits
Northeast: Calzada Ermita Iztapalapa, Col. Ampliación San Miguel
Southeast: Calzada Ermita Iztapalapa and. Av. San Lorenzo, Col. Ampliación San Miguel
Northwest: Calzada Ermita Iztapalapa, Col. Ampliación San Miguel
Southwest: Av. San Lorenzo and Calzada Ermita Iztapalapa, Col. Ampliación San Miguel

Ridership

References

External links 
 

UAM-I
Railway stations opened in 1994
1994 establishments in Mexico
Mexico City Metro stations in Iztapalapa
Railway stations in Mexico at university and college campuses